The NAIA Men's Golf Championship is the annual tournament to determine the national champions of men's NAIA collegiate golf in the United States and Canada. It has been held each year since 1952.

The most successful program is Oklahoma City, with 11 NAIA national titles. Keiser is the reigning national champion, having won their first national title in 2022.

Results

Team titles
The following schools have won an NAIA team championship:

Multiple winners

Individual champion
The following men have won more than one individual championship:
4: Danny Mijovic
2: Jamie Burns, Sam Cyr, Marion Hiskey, Craig Mertz, Steve Spray

Individual champion's school
The following schools have produced more than one individual champion:
11 champions: Texas Wesleyan
5 champions: Huntingdon, Oklahoma City
4 champions: Point Loma Nazarene
3 champions: Lamar Tech, North Texas State
2 champions: Campbell, Dalton State, East Texas State, Eastern New Mexico, Guilford, Malone, North Florida , Sam Houston State, Texas Lutheran

See also
NAIA Women's Golf Championship
NCAA Men's Golf Championships (Division I, Division II, Division III)

References

College golf in the United States
Golf
Amateur golf tournaments in the United States